Leslie "Les" Campbell was a New Zealand professional rugby league footballer who played in the 1910s. He played at representative level for New Zealand (Heritage № 89), and Wellington, and at club level for Newtown, as a forward (prior to the specialist positions of), during the era of contested scrums.

Playing career
Les Campbell played as a forward, i.e. number 12 in Wellington's 33-18 victory over Auckland during the 1913 New Zealand rugby league season Inter-district competition on Saturday 27 September 1913, this would be Wellington's last victory against Auckland until 1988.

International honours
Campbell represented New Zealand on their 1913 tour of Australia.

References

New Zealand national rugby league team players
New Zealand rugby league players
Place of birth missing
Place of death missing
Rugby league forwards
Wellington rugby league team players
Year of birth missing
Year of death missing